The WECT Tower was a 2175 ft *663m* -tall mast used as antenna for TV-broadcasting, including broadcasting the analog television signal of WECT channel 6. It was built in 1969 and was situated along NC 53 south of White Lake in Colly Township in Bladen County, North Carolina, United States. Before demolition, WECT Tower was, along with several other masts, the seventh tallest man-made structure ever created; and was not only the tallest structure in North Carolina, but also the tallest in the United States east of the Mississippi River.

On September 8, 2008, WECT ceased regular transmission of their analog signal from the Bladen County tower, relying instead on its newer digital transmitter in Winnabow. Following the switch, the analog signal remained on air until the end of September as a "Nightlight", broadcasting an instructional video explaining installation of converters and UHF antennas, but many who were able to receive WECT's former VHF analog signal would no longer be able to receive the station at all digitally, due to a shift to a UHF channel and a vastly smaller coverage area.

WECT continued to utilize the former analog tower for electronic news-gathering purposes before donating the tower and  site to the Green Beret Foundation in 2011. On September 20, 2012 at 12:47 PM, the tower was demolished with explosives to be scrapped. Proceeds from the sale of the land and the scrap metal of the tower will go to the foundation.

See also
WECT
List of masts
List of tallest structures
List of towers, Table of masts

References

External links 
 
 Skyscraper Page diagrams
 

Towers completed in 1969
Buildings and structures in Bladen County, North Carolina
Towers in North Carolina
Radio masts and towers in the United States
Demolished buildings and structures in North Carolina
Buildings and structures demolished by controlled implosion
1969 establishments in North Carolina
2012 disestablishments in North Carolina
Buildings and structures demolished in 2012
Former radio masts and towers